The first season of Food Wars!: Shokugeki no Soma anime television series was produced by J.C.Staff and directed by Yoshitomo Yonetani, the series was first announced in October 2014 by Shueisha. The season adapts the first eight volumes (chapters 1–60) of Yūto Tsukuda and Shun Saeki's manga series of the same name. The series was first broadcast in Japan on TBS from April 3 to September 25, 2015 with additional broadcasts on MBS, CBC, BS-TBS, and Animax. The video streaming service Crunchyroll simulcast the series with English subtitles to the United States, Canada, Australia, New Zealand, South Africa, Latin America, Europe (excluding French speaking territories and Italian speaking territories), the Middle East, and North Africa. Sentai Filmworks licensed the series for digital and home video distribution in North America.

In the United States, Adult Swim's Toonami programming block aired the English dub from July 7, 2019 to January 12, 2020.



Episode list

Notes

Home video releases

Japanese

English

References

External links
  
 

Food Wars!: Shokugeki no Soma episode lists
2015 Japanese television seasons